Hugo César Notario (born 15 March 1980) is an Argentine–born Paraguayan former footballer that played as a striker.

Honours

Club
Universidad de Chile
 Primera División de Chile (1): 2009 Apertura

Guaraní
 Paraguayan Primera División (1): 2010 Apertura

External links
  BDFA profile

1980 births
Living people
Sportspeople from Misiones Province
Argentine footballers
Argentine expatriate footballers
Club Guaraní players
12 de Octubre Football Club players
Sport Colombia footballers
Universidad de Chile footballers
Chilean Primera División players
Argentine expatriate sportspeople in Paraguay
Argentine expatriate sportspeople in Chile
Expatriate footballers in Chile
Expatriate footballers in Paraguay
Association football forwards